Frédéric Arpinon (born 9 May 1969) is a French former professional footballer. Arpinon played for several clubs in France and had a spell with Scottish side Hibernian. While coaching at FC Istres, he proposed a link-up with Hibernian. While at Metz he played in the final as they won the 1995–96 Coupe de la Ligue.

References

External links
 
 
 Profile - FC Metz
 Profile - Strasbourg

1969 births
Living people
Footballers from Nîmes
Association football midfielders
French footballers
Nîmes Olympique players
OGC Nice players
CS Sedan Ardennes players
FC Metz players
RC Strasbourg Alsace players
ES Troyes AC players
Hibernian F.C. players
Ligue 1 players
Ligue 2 players
French football managers
Scottish Premier League players
French expatriate footballers
Expatriate footballers in Scotland